Events from the year 1405 in Ireland.

Incumbent
Lord: Henry IV

Events

Births

Deaths
James Butler, 3rd Earl of Ormonde (b. c 1376)

 
1400s in Ireland
Ireland
Years of the 15th century in Ireland